Brandy and Ray J: A Family Business is an American reality television series that premiered on VH1 on April 11, 2010.

On November 15, 2010, VH1 announced that it renewed the series for a second season. The show's final episode aired on February 8, 2011.

Overview
The series follows Brandy and Ray J as they overcome the daily struggles in their family business and follows their daily lives.

Cast

Main cast
 Brandy Norwood – Ray J's older sister; R&B singer and actress
 Ray J Norwood – Brandy's younger brother; R&B singer and actor
 Sonja Bates-Norwood – Brandy and Ray J's mother and manager
 Willie Norwood – Brandy and Ray J's father and vocal coach

Supporting cast
 Shay Calhoun – Brandy's best friend
 Ryan Ramsey – Brandy and Ray J's cousin and manager
 Domo – Brandy's friend
 Lara – Brandy's friend
 Shorty Mack – Ray J's friend and rapper

Guest celebrities
 Rodney Jerkins
 Timbaland
 Tyrese
 Flo Rida
 Kelly Rowland
 Game
 Alia Kruz
 Big Boy
 Ludacris
 Gucci Mane

Episodes

Season 1: 2010

Season 2: 2010–2011

Ratings
The show debuted in its 9 pm slot with 1.4 million viewers and rose to 1.5 million for its repeat at 11 pm in the United States.

References

External links
 

2010 American television series debuts
2010s American reality television series
Brandy Norwood
English-language television shows
African-American reality television series
Television series based on singers and musicians
Television series by 51 Minds Entertainment
VH1 original programming
2011 American television series endings